Operation Safe Haven or Operation Safehaven may refer to:
Operation Safehaven (1944–48), investigation into German assets in foreign countries after World War II
Operation Safe Haven (1957), evacuation of Hungarian refugees to the United States
Operations Safe Haven and Safe Passage (1994–95), relief of overcrowding at Guantanamo Bay
Operation Provide Comfort (1991–96), Western protection to Iraqi Kurds
Operation Safehaven (2003–04), an American investigation into the Warez scene